Richard M. Hunt (1847 – November 20, 1895) was an American professional baseball player in the late 1860s to early 1870s who played mainly right field for the 1872 Brooklyn Eckfords of the National Association.  In 11 career games played, he scored 10 runs, and collected 15 hits in 46 at bats for a .326 batting average.  Hunt died in New York City on November 20, 1895, and is interred at Green-Wood Cemetery in Brooklyn, New York.

References

External links

Major League Baseball right fielders
New York Mutuals (NABBP) players
Brooklyn Stars players
Brooklyn Eckfords (NABBP) players
Brooklyn Eckfords players
Burials at Green-Wood Cemetery
19th-century baseball players
1847 births
1895 deaths
Baseball players from New York (state)